A Blessing and a Curse is the sixth studio album by American rock band Drive-By Truckers, released in 2006. It peaked at #50 on the Billboard 200, which was the highest charting for the band until 2008's follow up, Brighter Than Creation's Dark, which hit #37.

Background

A Blessing and a Curse is regarded as the Drive-by Truckers' most controversial and polarizing album by both the band and fans.  This is the last album to feature Jason Isbell on guitar as he left the band in spring of 2007.  A Blessing and a Curse is a departure from Drive-By Truckers' previous sound, exhibiting less of a 'southern-rock' chemistry and taking on a more classic rock edge than any of their previous records.  Approximately half of the songs were recorded within hours of them being written.

Guitarist Patterson Hood has explained that A Blessing and A Curse was made at a rather difficult point in the band's history.  He explains that the band was "trying to find common ground at a time when it was a little hard to come by."  Hood also says in his online commentary of the album that he prefers the second side of the album over the first.  "A World of Hurt" is Hood's second favorite song he has written (his favorite being Gangstabilly's "The Living Bubba").  The title of Barr Weissman's documentary of the Drive-By Truckers, "The Secret To A Happy Ending," is taken from a line from "A World of Hurt."

Track listing

Personnel 
 Mike Cooley – guitar, vocals
 Patterson Hood – guitar, vocals
 Jason Isbell – guitar, vocals
 Brad Morgan – drums
 Shonna Tucker – bass

Chart performance

References 
 Drive-By Truckers Website

Drive-By Truckers albums
2006 albums
New West Records albums